Quick Picks for Reluctant Young Adult Readers is a book list created annually by the Young Adult Library Services Association. The list identifies fiction, nonfiction, and graphic novels that may encourage teenagers who dislike reading to read.

Researchers, educators, librarians, parents, and teenagers have used the list to identify books reluctant young adult readers may enjoy.

Criteria 
When selecting books for the Quick Picks list, the judges consider:

 Physical appearance (e.g., the cover, print style, format, and artwork/illustrations)
 Writing style

For fiction novels, judges consider whether the book has:

 High interest "hook" in first 10 pages
 Well-defined characters
 Sufficient plot to sustain interest
 Plot lines developed through dialogue and action
 Familiar themes with emotional appeal for teenagers
 Believable treatment
 Single point of view
 Touches of humor when appropriate
 Chronological order

For informational books, judges consider the accuracy and objectivity of the book, as well as whether technical language is well-defined.

Recipients

References 

Lists of books
American Library Association awards
English-language literary awards
Young adult literature awards
American literary awards